Gisela Jacob (née Gisela Arendt; 5 November 1918 – 18 February 1969) was a German swimmer who won three medals at the 1934 European Aquatics Championships and two medals at the 1936 Summer Olympics. She also competed at the 1952 Olympics and finished seventh in the 4 × 100 m freestyle relay.

She won eight national titles in the 100 m freestyle (1933–1937, 1939, 1949) and 100 m backstroke (1934), competing as Arendt before World War II and as Jacob after the war.

Her brother, Heinz Arendt, and son, Rainer Jacob, (b. 1946) were both Olympics swimmers, and Heinz competed alongside Gisela at the 1936 Olympics.

References

1918 births
1969 deaths
German female swimmers
German female freestyle swimmers
Olympic swimmers of Germany
Swimmers at the 1936 Summer Olympics
Swimmers at the 1952 Summer Olympics
Olympic silver medalists for Germany
Olympic bronze medalists for Germany
Olympic bronze medalists in swimming
German female backstroke swimmers
European Aquatics Championships medalists in swimming
Medalists at the 1936 Summer Olympics
Swimmers from Berlin
Olympic silver medalists in swimming
20th-century German women